The Lenovo ThinkPad W700 is a laptop that was manufactured by Lenovo.

References

External links 
 IBM.com
 thinkwiki.org - W700
 thinkwiki.de - W700

Lenovo laptops
ThinkPad